Cherkizovskaya is a Moscow Metro station in the Preobrazhenskoye District, Eastern Administrative Okrug, Moscow. It is on the Sokolnicheskaya Line, between Preobrazhenskaya Ploshchad and Ulitsa Podbelskogo stations.

Design
Cherkizovskaya opened in 1990 and was the work of architects V. Cheremin and A. Vigdorov. The station is named after the former village of Cherkizovo which is a district of Moscow nowadays. The design of the station is a single vault, with a curved ceiling and a platform free of pillars. The outer walls are faced with panels of corrugated metal. Both ends of the platform are decorated with stained-glass panels above the exit stairs.

Entrances
The station's vestibule is located at Okruzhnoy Proyezd near the intersection with Bolshaya Cherkizovskaya Street. Lokomotiv Stadium is situated nearby.

References

Moscow Metro stations
Railway stations in Russia opened in 1990
Sokolnicheskaya Line
Railway stations located underground in Russia